Type K may refer to:

Type K thermocouple
Type K Star
The type K power plug used in Denmark